The Habr Je'lo (Full Name: Mūsa ibn ash-Shaykh Isḥāq ibn Aḥmad, historically known as the Habr Toljaala is a major sub-tribe of the wider Isaaq family. Its members form the  confederation along with the Ibran, Sanbuur and Tolje’lo. 

The Habr Je'lo played a prominent role in the livestock and frankincense trade during the pre-colonial period. The Habr Je'lo also partook in a major organised front to oppose British rule in the late 19th and early 20th centuries under the leadership of Haji Sudi and other subsequent anti-colonial leaders hailing from the same tribe. The Habr Je'lo are divided into three further sub-tribes: the Mohamed Abokor, Musa Abokor, and Omar. Historically, the Mohamed Abokor were chiefly nomadic pastoralists, whereas the Musa Abokor and Omar obtained much of their wealth via their frankincense plantations in the mountainous interior adjacent to the coastline.

Distribution

The Habr je'lo (Habarjeclo) tribes reside in eastern Togdheer, eastern Sahil, western Sanaag and western Sool regions in Somaliland. The sub-tribe also inhabits the Somali region in Ethiopia, especially in the Degehbur zone. They also have a large settlement in Kenya where they are known as a constituent segment of the Isahakia community.

History

Antiquity 
The ancient city of Mosyllum, situated at the coast of Habr Je'lo inhabited lands, has been described as the largest and most important port city of the Erythrean Sea, exporting cinnamon, frankincense and myrrh. Ralph E. Drake-Brockman states in his 1912 book British Somaliland:

Heis, another port town inhabited by the Habr Je'lo, is said to be identical with the ancient trading post of Mundus that is described in the Periplus of the Erythraean Sea, an anonymous account by a Greek Alexandrian salesman from the 1st century CE.

A large collection of cairns of various types lie near the city. Excavations here have yielded pottery and sherds of Roman glassware from a time between the 1st and 5th centuries. Among these artefacts is high-quality millefiori glass. Dated to 0-40 CE, it features red flower disks superimposed on a green background. Additionally, an ancient fragment of a footed bowl was discovered in the surrounding area. The sherd is believed to have been made in Aswan (300-500 CE) or Lower Nubia (500-600 CE), suggesting early trading ties with kingdoms in the Nile Valley. Ancient edifices have also been found in Heis.

Arawelo 
According to traditional Somali folklore, Arawelo, a legendary proto-Somali queen who is said to have established a matriarchal society, was based in lands inhabited by the Habr Je'lo, specifically a place called Murihi in the Togdheer region. Ralph E. Drake-Brockman was one of the first Western researchers to publish an account of Arawelo, in his 1912 book British Somaliland he states:The story says that thousands of years ago there lived in what is now the tract of country occupied by the Habr Toljaala tribe, a great Somali queen called Arawailo, who was greatly feared by her people owing to her eccentricities. Arawailo lived at a place called Murihi, so the story goes, for little save a huge mound of stones, under which she is said to lie buried, now marks the capital of her ancient kingdom. Towards the end of her life Arawailo began to show marked favour towards her own sex and great animosity towards her male subjects.

Early modern 
The Habr Toljaala derived a large supply of frankincense from the trees south in the mountains near port town of Heis. This trade was lucrative and with gum and skins being traded in high quantity, Arab and Indian merchants would visit these ports early in the season to get these goods cheaper than at Berbera or Zeyla before continuing westwards along the Somali coast. During the British Somaliland period the recorded statistics of Heis show it as a leader alongside Maydh in the east with hundreds of thousands of hides and being the leading exporter of tanned skins with 16,000 reaching Berbera taken by Habr Je'lo traders by dhow. Heis also exported a large quantity of skins and sheep to Aden as well as imported a significant amount of goods from both the Arabian coast and western Somali ports, reaching nearly 2 million rupees by 1903.

John Hanning Speke, an English explorer who made an exploratory expedition to the area in an attempt to reach the Nugaal Valley, described the port town:

Pre-colonial era 
The Habr Je’lo coastal settlements and ports, stretching from near Siyara in the west to Heis (Xiis) in the east, were important to trade and communication with the Somali interior. While the settlements were not as significant as the more established ports of Berbera, Zeila and Bulhar (respectively), the principle Habr Je’lo port of Kurrum (Karin) was a major market for livestock and frankincense procured from the interior, and was a favorite for livestock traders due to the close proximity of the port to Aden. Habr Je’lo traders acted as middlemen to Dhulbahante livestock herders in the interior by purchasing and/or bartering their stock for export to the Aden market:

Isaaq Sultanate 
The Habr Je'lo were part of the Isaaq Sultanate which was established by the Rer Guled branch of the Eidagale after the Isaaq successfully defeated the Absame clan at Lafaruug in the 17th century. With time the Habr Yunis and later the Habr Awal and Habr Je'lo would break from the Isaaq Sultanate with the Habr Je'lo forming their own sultanate.

Burning of Karin 
In 1831, the Yeesif, a sub-subtribe of the Mohamed Abokor, was in control of the historic trading port town of Karin. A multitude of other tribes were also present in the town to trade, notably the Adan Madoba. According to Somali history, Karin was a gated town, with the Yeesif sub-subtribe controlling who could enter and leave the town, investing heavily in protecting the town due to its importance.

In 1831 a girl of the Rer Dod sub-subtribe married a young Yeesif warrior, however, a man of the Adan Madoba, another subtribe of the Mohamed Abokor, also intended to marry her and couldn’t accept the fact that the marriage took place. The Adan Madoba man went to his tribesmen and explained the situation to them, threatening to sever his testicles if the tribe did not intervene. The Adan Madoba tribesmen then assassinated the Yeesif groom, which led to a 40 year long conflict where allegedly the grandson of the Rer Dod girl participated in the fighting. The conflict is described by British explorer Richard Burton in 1855, who stated:

With the conflict still raging, in 1871 the Adan Madoba, on the verge of turning the Yeesif to extinct, and after losing 19 men to a Yeesif counterattack, decided one last attack on the Yeesif would finally win them this long war and allow them to conquer Karin. The Adan Madoba assembled hundreds of horsemen led by Mohamed Ismail (nicknamed Qaaje Guray) for one final offensive on the Yeesif still in Karin. Days before the attack Qaaje Gurey presented his tribesmen three options; to either attack Karin, a majority Yeesif town but also inhabited by the Nuh (a sub-subtribe of the Mohamed Abokor) and kill anyone in Karin, surround Karin first and call on all the non-Yeesif tribes to evacuate the town immediately and attack the town once evacuation has been completed, or to burn the town in its entirety. The Adan Madoba opted for the second option.

The Adan Madona approached Karin and ordered the Nuh to evacuate Karin, notifying them of their intent to attack the Yeesif. However, the Nuh tribesmen refused and aided their Yeesif brothers, as according to folklore the ancestors of the Nuh and Yeesif tribes shared the same mother. The Adan Madoba proceeded to attack Karin and successfully burned the town down. However, they failed to defeat the combined Yeesif-Nuh forces and soon the Adan Madoba were forced to retreat, effectively ending the Yeesif-Adan Madoba conflict.

Dirir Warsame, a Yeesif tribal soldier came upon a man of the Adan Madoba named Halil who was captured by Yeesif tribesmen. Dirir recited this poem before killing him;

Anti-Colonial Movements

Dervish movement

The Habr Je’lo were one of the first sub-tribes in the Somaliland Protectrate to revolt against the Colonial government between the late 19th and early 20th centuries. Among their prominent anti-colonial ideologues during the Dervish period were Deria Arale, Deria Gure, Abdallah Shihiri, Ibrahim Boghol and Haji Sudi, the latter is credited for importing Dervish customs into the Somali peninsula as well as being one of the original founders of the Somali Dervish Movement. Moreover, the Habr Je'lo played an influential role after the demise of the Dervish Movement in 1920, with Sheikh Bashir Yussuf and Farah Omar being important anti-colonial notables.  

The Dervish movement first arose in Burao in 1899, where in the summer of that year Dervish leaders and their followers congregated at the settlement. Haji Suudi leading his tribesmen declared war on the British lest they stop interfering with their religious and internal affairs. The dervish then proceeded to send this letter to Captain Cordeauxe and James Hayes Sadler:

This is to inform you that you have done whatever you have desired, and oppressed our well-known religion without any cause. Further, to inform you that whatever people bring to you they are liars and slanderers. Further, to inform you that Mahomed, your Akil, came to ask from us the arms we therefore, send you this letter. Now choose for yourself; if you want war we accept it, if you want peace pay the fine. September 1, 1899.

According to the British War Office, the Ahmed Farah, Rer Yusuf and Adan Madoba Habr Je'lo sub-tribes were among the first to join the Dervish rebellion. Haji Sudi, along with Mohammed Abdullah Hassan and Sultan Nur led the first Dervish forces against the British at Samala, Ferdidin, Erigo and Gumburu. 

Moreover, the coastal Habr Je'lo sub-tribes provided significant armaments to the Dervish forces in the interior. Before sending troops to confront the Dervish at Samala, Consul-General Hayes Sadler gave the following instructions to the commander Eric John Eagles Swayne:

In the unlikely event of the Mullah offering to surrender, in his case and that of the Following: Haji Sudi, Deria Arale, Deria Gure Only an unconditional surrender should be accepted no guarantee of any kind to future treatment been given. Sultan Nur, the Sultan of the Habr Yunis, may be guaranteed his life. J. Hayes-Sadler, His Britannic Majesty's Consul-General, Somali Coast Protectorate. Aden April 11, 1901.

Although facing the British in multiple battles between 1901 and 1904, the colonial forces failed to in their efforts to apprehend Sudi, Arale, Gure and their fellow Dervishes. Gabriel Ferrand, the Vice-Consul of France following these events observed that:

Neither the Mahdi nor his chief adviser Ahmed Warsama, better known under the name Haji Sudi, nor the Sultan Nur, leader of the Habr Younis sub-tribe were killed or captured. The optimism of Colonel Sadler and Lieutenant-Colonel Swayne in the latest reports relating to military operations is inexplicable.

Abdalah Shihiri and Deria Arale led the 1904 Dervish delegation that facilitated the Ilig or Pestollaza agreement between the Dervish and Italy. This treaty allowed the Dervishes to peacefully settle in Italian Somaliland with some autonomy.

In 1920, the British air force commenced their bombardment of Dervish fort and their ground assault on Taleh fort. Haji Sudi, the highest ranking Dervish after Mohammed Abdullah Hassan and Ibrahim Boghol, commander of the northern Dervish army died valiantly defending the Taleh.

1945 Sheikh Bashir Rebellion

The 1945 Sheikh Bashir Rebellion was a rebellion waged by tribesmen of the Habr Je'lo sub-tribe in the cities of Burao and Erigavo in the former British Somaliland protectorate against British authorities in July 1945 led by Sheikh Bashir, a Somali religious leader belonging to the Yeesif sub-division.

On 2 July, Sheikh Bashir collected 25 of his followers in the town of Wadamago and transported them on a lorry to the vicinity of Burao, where he distributed arms to half of his followers. On the evening of 3 July the group entered Burao and opened fire on the police guard of the central prison in the city, which was filled with prisoners arrested for previous demonstrations. The group also attacked the house of the district commissioner of Burao District, Major Chambers, resulting in the death of Major Chamber's police guard before escaping to Bur Dhab, a strategic mountain south-east of Burao, where Sheikh Bashir's small unit occupied a fort and took up a defensive position in anticipation of a British counterattack.

The British campaign against Sheikh Bashir's troops proved abortive after several defeats as his forces kept moving from place to place and avoiding any permanent location. No sooner had the expedition left the area, than the news traveled fast among the Somali nomads across the plain. The war had exposed the British administration to humiliation. The government came to a conclusion that another expedition against him would be useless; that they must build a railway, make roads and effectively occupy the whole of the protectorate, or else abandon the interior completely. The latter course was decided upon, and during the first months of 1945, the advance posts were withdrawn and the British administration confined to the coast town of Berbera.

Sheikh Bashir settled many disputes among the tribes in the vicinity, which kept them from raiding each other. He was generally thought to settle disputes through the use of Islamic Sharia and gathered around him a strong following.

Sheikh Bashir sent a message to religious figures in the town of Erigavo and called on them to revolt and join the rebellion he led. The religious leaders as well as the people of Erigavo heeded his call, and mobilized a substantial number of people in Erigavo armed with rifles and spears and staged a revolt. The British authorities responded rapidly and severely, sending reinforcements to the town and opening fire on the armed mobs in two "local actions" as well as arresting minor religious leaders in the town.

The British administration recruited Indian and South African troops, led by police general James David, to fight against Sheikh Bashir and had intelligence plans to capture him alive. The British authorities mobilized a police force, and eventually on 7 July found Sheikh Bashir and his unit in defensive positions behind their fortifications in the mountains of Bur Dhab. After clashes Sheikh Bashir and his second-in-command, Alin Yusuf Ali, nicknamed Qaybdiid, were killed. A third rebel was wounded and was captured along with two other rebels. The rest fled the fortifications and dispersed. On the British side the police general leading the British troops as well as a number of Indian and South African troops perished in the clashes, and a policeman was injured.

Despite the death of Sheikh Bashir and his followers resistance against British authorities continued in Somaliland, especially in Erigavo where his death stirred further resistance in the town and the town of Badhan and lead to attacks on British colonial troops throughout the district and the seizing of arms from the rural constabulary.

Despite the death of Sheikh Bashir and his second-in-command, the British authorities was not finished with the rebels and continued its counter-insurgency campaign. The authorities had quickly learned the names and identities of all the followers of Sheikh Bashir and tried to convince the locals to turn them in. When they refused, the authorities invoked the Collective Punishment Ordinance, under which the authorities seized and impounded a total of 6,000 camels owned by the Habr Je'lo, the sub-tribe that Sheikh Bashir belonged to. The British authorities made the return of the livestock dependent on the turning over and arrest of the escaped rebels. The remaining rebels were subsequently found and arrested, and transported to the Saad-ud-Din archipelago, off the coast of Zeila in northwestern Somaliland.

Lineage
Below is a breakdown of the different sub-divisions of the Habr Je'lo sub-subtribe:

Sheikh Ishaaq Bin Ahmed Al Hashimi (Sheikh Ishaaq)
 Habar Magaadle
  Ayub
  Muhammad (Arap)
  Ismail (Garhajis)-
 Habar Shariifo
  Abdirahman (Habr Awal)
Habar Habusheed (Habeshat)
  Ahmed (Tol-Ja'lo) 
  Ibrahiim (Sanbuur)
  Muhammad ('Ibraan)
  Muse 
Mohamed Muse
Abokor Muse
Jibril Abokor
Daud Jibril (Rer Dod)
Omar Jibril
Ishaq Omar
Bi'ide Omar
Abokor Jibril
Mohamed Abokor
 Adan Mohamed (Adan Madoba)
 Yesif Mohamed
 Nuh Mohamed
 Abdalle Nuh
 Abdille Abdalle
 Abokor Abdille (Solomadow)
 Hassan Abdille (Solomadow)
 Barre Abdille (Solomadow)
 Samatar Barre
 Ahmed Barre
 Kul Barre
 Nabad Barre
 Hussein Abdille
 Allamagan Abdille
 Farah Abdille
 Beila Farah
 Fahiye Farah
 Dahir Farah (Rer Dahir)
 Ahmed Dahir
 Nuh Dahir
 Guled Dahir
 Kalil Dahir
 Barre Dahir
 Ogal Dahir
 Hassan Dahir
 Wa'ays Dahir
 Yusuf Dahir
 Ibrahim Dahir
 Hildid Dahir
 Adan Dahir
 Omar Dahir
 Abokor Omar
 Muse Omar
 Bah Abdirahman
 Bah Eise
 Ismail Omar
 Yusuf Ismail (Rer Yusuf)
 Ahmed Farah
 Roble Ahmed
 Abtidon Ahmed (Rer Abtidon)
 Abokor Ahmed
 Biniin Ahmed (Reer Biniin)
 Had Ahmed
 Hasan Ahmed
 Salah Hasan (Rer Salah)
 Hildid Ahmed
 Abdi Hildid
 Mohamed Ahmed
 Rage Mohamed (Rer Rage)
 Baded Mohamed (Rer Baded)
 Olow Mohamed
 Burale Mohamed
 Jibril Mohamed
Musa Abokor
 Uduruhmin Muse
 Idris Muse
 Abdirahman Muse
 Osman Abdirahman (Bah Majeelo)
 Abdille Abdirahman (Bah Majeelo)
 Isaaq Abdirahman (Bah Majeelo)
 Yunis Abdirahman (Rer Yunis)
 Mohamed Yunis
 Osman Yunis
 Barre Abdirahman
 Ali Barre
 Mohamed Barre
 Yunis Barre
 Burale Yunis
 Bi'ide Yunis (Biciide)
 Iidle Biciide
Wadhowr Biciide (Bahsanbuur)
Samatar Biciide (Bahsanbuur)
 Farah Biciide
 Ahmed Farah 
 Iidle Farah (Rer Iidle)
Omar Farah (Boho)
Fahiye Farah (Boho)
Muse Farah (Boho)
Robsuge Farah (Boho)
Gedi Farah (Boho)
Wais Farah (Boho)
Sahal Farah (Boho)
Abdille Farah (Bah Farwiyo)
Ali Farah (Bah Farwiyo)
 Samane Abokor
 Abdulle Samane
 Muse Samane
 Hirsi Samane

Groups
National United Front, a mainly Habar Jeclo political party in the late 1950s
Dharbash, a medium-sized of the dozen Darawiish administrative divisions, was one third Habar Jeclo, the rest Ararsame or Baharsame

Notable figures

 Ismail Ali Abokar – was a Major General and a senior member of the Supreme Revolutionary Council who also served as Vice President of Somalia from 1971 to 1982.
 Sheekh Bashiir – religious leader and post-dervish anti-colonial figure 
 Ibrahim Boghol – member of the Dervish council and commander of the northern Dervish army
 Abdi Awad Ali - a somali business tycoon and an entrepreneur known as Indhadeero , was one of the wealthiest men in East Africa and the first man to built a mall in Somalia.
 Abdirashid Duale – a British-Somali entrepreneur and the CEO of Dahabshiil, an international funds transfer company.
 Kite Fiqi – military leader and poet
 Salaan Carrabey – legendary poet
 Musa Haji Ismail Galal – Somali linguist and historian who reformed the Somali Wadaad script and immensely contributed to the creation of the Somali Latin script.
 Hadraawi – most notable contemporary Somali poet
 Michael Mariano – legendary Somali politician, lawyer and key figure in independence struggle and Somali Youth League
 Ahmed Mohamed Mohamoud – former president of Somaliland
 Farah Omar – anti-colonial ideologue and founder of the first Somali Association
 Saleban Mohamed Salad- Well known politician 
 Haji Sudi – chief lieutenant and one of the leaders of the Somali Dervish rebellion
Mohamed Kahin Ahmed – Minister of Interior of Somaliland
 Mohamed Yusuf Abdirahman – former Mayor of Burao
 Allin Mohamoud Dirir - first Somali to hold public office in the UK
 Aadan Mire Waqaf  - former Mayor of Burco and the former Minister of Justice in Somaliland
Bashe Awil Omar - Deputy Foreign Minister of Somaliland as well as former Somaliland ambassador to Kenya and the UAE
Mohamed Abdillahi Duale - former Minister of Foreign Affairs in Somaliland
 Suleiman Mohamoud Adan – speaker of the House of Elders of Somaliland
 Buurmadow – well known tribe elder
 Mukhtar Ali - football player
 Mohamoud Hashi Abdi – former Minister of Civil Aviation and Air Transport and Minister of Presidency of Somaliland, former Mayor of Burco
 Mohammed Ahmed – Canadian long-distance runner won the silver medal at the 2020 Tokyo Olympics in the 5000m
 Magid Magid – Somali-British activist and politician who served as the Lord Mayor of Sheffield from May 2018 to May 2019
 Bashir Abdi – Somali-Belgian athlete who won the bronze medal in the marathon at the 2020 Summer Olympics
 Chunkz – English YouTuber, musician, host and entertainer
 Abdallah Shihiri – a senior Khusuusi member of the Somali Dervish movement
 Osman Dubbe – current Minister of Information, Culture and Tourism of Somalia
 Deria Arale – senior Khusuusi member of the Somali Dervish movement
Jama Mohamoud Egal – Minister of Energy and Minerals of Somaliland

References

Somali clans in Ethiopia
Isaaq Sultanate